Mapo Station is a station on Seoul Subway Line 5 in Mapo-gu, Seoul.  It is located close to the northeastern end of the Mapo Bridge.

Station layout

References

Metro stations in Mapo District
Seoul Metropolitan Subway stations
Railway stations opened in 1996